Joyce Grant (23 January 1924 – 11 July 2006) was a UK-based South African actress known for her comedic roles. Grant was born in Bloemfontein, South Africa and her father encouraged her to move to London to study acting. When she returned to South Africa, her roles included: "Lola" in William Inge's Come Back Little Sheba and as "Laura Wingfield" in Tennessee Williams' The Glass Menagerie. At the end of the 1950s she returned permanently to London and appeared in: The Happy Apple, Something’s Afoot, The Club, Deathtrap and Tonight at Eight-thirty. On television she was in Gideon's Way "How to Retire without Really Working".

She appeared in the TV musical Pickwick for the BBC in 1969 and played opposite Frankie Howerd on Broadway in Rockefeller and the Red Indians.  In 1980 she appeared in the first episode of Hi-de-Hi! playing the mother of Jeffrey Fairbrother.In 1987, Joyce became a member of  The National Theatre Company, appearing in three productions, Ting Tang Mine, Fathers and Sons and Six Characters in Search of an Author. In 1988, she played Aunt Em/Glinda in the Royal Shakespeare Company's The Wizard of Oz and Mother Superior in Black Adder S1E3-The Archbishop.

Retirement and legacy
After retiring from the stage she became a "buddy" to HIV+ patients at the Lighthouse in London and she's featured in two Lewis Morley portraits in the National Portrait Gallery.
Joyce Grant died on 11 July 2006, from cancer, aged 82.

References

External links
 

1924 births
2006 deaths
British film actresses
British stage actresses
British television actresses
Deaths from cancer in England
British lesbian actresses

Actresses from London
People from Bloemfontein
South African stage actresses
British humanitarians
South African humanitarians
20th-century British women singers
20th-century South African women singers
South African emigrants to the United Kingdom
20th-century LGBT people